Strawberry Bubblegum: A Collection of Pre-10CC Strawberry Studio Recordings 1969–1972 is a compilation of songs recorded at Strawberry Studios in Stockport, England, by the four musicians – Graham Gouldman, Eric Stewart, Kevin Godley and Lol Creme – who in 1972 would form the British pop band 10cc, along with occasional guest vocalists.

Overview
The compilation includes several singles by future 10cc members’ related bands, which include: a single by Festival "Today" b/w "Warm Me" (early incarnation of 10cc) with the former song being re-recording of the Hotlegs track from Song, the single by Doctor Father "Umbopo" b/w "Roll On", an alter ego of Hotlegs (Kevin Godley, Lol Creme and Eric Stewart), three singles by Peter Cowap, former Gouldman’s acquaintance from Herman’s Hermits, with additional single by Grumble, a Peter Cowap led band that included all of future 10cc members, two singles recorded for Manchester football clubs: "Willie Morgan" b/w "Travellin Man" for United and "Boys in Blue" b/w "Funky City" for City.

Other records on the album include various singles with and without b-sides by different bands and musicians recorded at Strawberry Studios, including songs done for the American bubblegum production team of Super K Productions, by whom Gouldman was employed as a writer during this time.

On several tracks Graham Gouldman is credited under the pseudonym of S. Hillary.

The compilation was reissued as part of 2017 box set Before During After - The Story of 10cc with the exact tracklisting and running order minus four tracks: "Come On Plane" by Silver Fleet, "Susan’s Tuba" by Freddie and the Dreamers, "When He Comes" by Fighter Squadron and hidden track "Santa Claus" by Leslie Crowther.

Track listing

References

10cc albums
2003 compilation albums
Albums produced by Graham Gouldman
Albums produced by Eric Stewart